Mark Everett may refer to:

 Mark Oliver Everett (born 1963), musician
 Mark Everett (runner) (born 1968), American 800 meters athlete
 Manuel Benitez (1969–2008), child-actor whose stage name was Mark Everett
 Mark Everett (cricketer) (born 1967), former English cricketer

See also
 Mark Everett Fuller, U.S. judge